A pinhead mirror can be used to create a camera similar to a pinhole camera. Instead of passing through a tiny aperature, the light to form the image is reflected by a small disc-shaped mirror (with a diameter the same as that of a pinhole; about 0.15 mm - 0.4 mm). One advantage is that a pinhead mirror can be swiveled to scan a scene or project a scene to different locations.

Pinhead mirror technology was protected under US patent 4,948,211 - "Method and Apparatus for Optical Imaging Using a Small, Flat Reflecting Surface" until the patent expired in 2009.

References
 TH Nilsson (1986) "The Pinhead mirror: A previously undiscovered imaging device?" Applied Optics, 25, 2863-2864
 TH Nilsson (1987) "Pinhead mirrors: imaging, computing and the nature of light" Pinhole Journal, 4, 2–5.

Cameras by type